St James's Gate Football Club is an Irish association football club based in Drimnagh/Crumlin, Dublin. They played in the League of Ireland between 1921–22 and 1943–44 and again from 1990–91 until 1995–96. Gate were the inaugural winners of both the League of Ireland and the FAI Cup. Like several fellow early League of Ireland clubs, such as Fordsons, Jacobs, Midland Athletic and Dundalk, Gate had their origins as a factory or works team. They were initially the football team of the St James's Gate Brewery, the home of Guinness. In July 2022 they narrowly survived folding and survived due to a public appeal.

History

Early years
The club was founded in 1902. The prime mover behind forming the club was John Lumsden, then serving as a medical officer at St James's Gate Brewery. The club first gained national recognition in 1909–10 when they won both the Leinster Senior League title and the Irish Intermediate Cup. In 1919–20, with a team that included Charlie Dowdall, Paddy Duncan and Ernie MacKay, Gate won four trophies – the Leinster Senior League title, the Irish Intermediate Cup, the Leinster Senior Cup and the LFA Metropolitan Cup.

First League of Ireland era
In 1921–22, together with Shelbourne, Bohemians, Jacobs, Frankfort, Olympia, YMCA and Dublin United, Gate became founder members of the League of Ireland. Like Gate, the other seven founding members had spent the 1920–21 season playing in the Leinster Senior League. Gate initially emerged as one of the strongest teams in the league and in their debut season won a treble. In addition to winning the inaugural league title, they also won the 1921–22 FAI Cup and the 1921–22 Leinster Senior Cup. This season proved to be the highlight of Gate's time in the League of Ireland. In 1939–40 they won a second league title, however after finishing in last place in 1943–44 they failed to gain re-election. It had been suggested that the reason for this was the club announcing its intention to revert to amateur status. However, when the vote was being taken, the representative for Shamrock Rovers stated, "the St. James's Gate club has not full control over their own finances, as any profit made during the season goes to the Guinness Athletic Union and is therefore lost to football." The other clubs were also known to be unhappy that members of the Guinness Athletic Union did not have to pay into home matches, depriving those clubs of their share of gate receipts.

Placings

Records

Source:

Second League of Ireland era
In 1990–91 Gate joined the League of Ireland First Division, replacing Newcastlewest. In 1995, the club was taken over by a consortium. Only one year later, however, just before the start of the 1996–97 they pulled out of the league, unable to meet their financial responsibilities.  They were replaced by St. Francis.

110th Anniversary Tournament
To celebrate their 110th anniversary, in July 2012 the club hosted a tournament.

Semi-finals

Third place play-off

Final

Grounds
Gate originally played their home games at Bellevue Lodge by the Grand Canal near Inchicore. The same venue was also used by Olympia. Between 1921 and 1928 they played at St. James's Park in Dolphin's Barn on a pitch hired by the Guinness board. In 1928 they moved to their current home at the Iveagh Grounds.

Notable former players
Republic of Ireland internationals
On 28 May 1924 when Ireland made their international debut at the 1924 Olympics against Bulgaria, the Ireland team included three Gate players – Paddy Duncan, Michael Farrell and Ernie MacKay. A fourth member of the team, Paddy O'Reilly, would also later play for the club. Duncan also scored the Republic of Ireland's first international goal. Joe O'Reilly, with 20, was also the most capped player for Ireland in the pre–Second World War era.

Republic of Ireland women's internationals
  Katie Taylor
  Mary Waldron
Republic of Ireland U21 internationals
  John Bacon
  Martin Bayly
  Ritchie Bayly
League of Ireland XI representatives
  Mick Byrne
  Pat Byrne
  Paul Byrne
  Martin Colfer
Ireland (IFA) internationals
In addition to playing for Ireland teams selected by the FAI, at least five Gate players also played for Ireland teams selected by the Irish Football Association.
  Johnny Carey – Senior
  Ernie MacKay – Junior
  Emmet McLoughlin – Amateur
  Frank Heaney – Amateur
  Harry Litton – Amateur

Goalscorers
On seven occasions St James's Gate players finished as the League of Ireland's top goalscorer. On 30 March 1930, Willie Byrne scored six goals in a 7–1 win against Sligo Rovers. Paddy Bradshaw, with 68, remains Gate's top goalscorer in the League of Ireland.

Boxer
  Katie Taylor – Irish, European, World and Olympic boxing champion

Honours
 League of Ireland : 2
1921–22, 1939–40
Leinster Senior League: 6
1909–10, 1911–12, 1914–15, 1919–20, 1987–88, 1988–89
 FAI Cup : 2
1921–22, 1937–38
 League of Ireland Shield : 2
1935–36, 1940–41
Dublin City Cup : 1
1938–39
Leinster Senior Cup: 5
1919–20, 1921–22, 1934–35, 1936–37, 1940–41
LFA Metropolitan Cup
1919–20
 Irish Intermediate Cup : 2
1909–10, 1919–20
 FAI Intermediate Cup : 1
1950–51

References

1902 establishments in Ireland
Association football clubs established in 1902
Association football clubs in Dublin (city)
Defunct League of Ireland clubs
Leinster Senior League (association football) clubs
 
Works association football teams in Ireland